Richard Kingscote Whiley (born 10 October 1935) is a former English cricketer.  Whiley was a right-handed batsman.  He was born in Gloucester, Gloucestershire and educated at Malvern College.

Whiley made a single first-class appearance for Gloucestershire against the touring Pakistanis at the College Ground, Cheltenham in 1954.  In this match he batted twice, scoring 7 not out and 4 not out, in what was a drawn match.  This was his only major appearance for Gloucestershire.  Four years later, while studying at Brasenose College, Oxford, he made a single first-class appearance for Oxford University Cricket Club against Lancashire at University Parks, Oxford.  In the Oxford first-innings, Whiley was dismissed for 4 runs by Roy Tattersall, while in their second-innings he was dismissed for 2 runs by the same bowler, with a low scoring encounter ending in a draw.

In 1964, Whiley made his debut for Dorset in the Minor Counties Championship against Wiltshire.  He played Minor counties cricket for Dorset from 1964 to 1967, making a total of 36 Minor Counties Championship appearances.

References

External links
Richard Whiley at ESPNcricinfo
Richard Whiley at CricketArchive

1935 births
Living people
Cricketers from Gloucester
People educated at Malvern College
Alumni of Brasenose College, Oxford
English cricketers
Gloucestershire cricketers
Oxford University cricketers
Dorset cricketers